Frank McLoughlin may refer to:
 Frank McLoughlin (politician) (born 1946), Irish Labour Party politician
 Frank McLoughlin (footballer)

See also
 Frank McLaughlin (disambiguation)